Golden House is a 2010 South Korean television series starring Shin Ha-kyun, Lee Bo-young, and Baek Yoon-sik. It aired on cable channel tvN from March 5 to May 27, 2010 on Fridays at 23:00 for 20 episodes.

Plot
When the owner of a shabby, soon-to-be-demolished villa in a run-down part of Seoul mysteriously dies, it sets in motion a chain of events that touches many lives. As Bok-gyu navigates his way through the web of mystery surrounding his father's death, he encounters intrusive neighbors, oddball residents, a hardcore gangster and a beautiful girl — any of whom may have their eyes set on his money. When he meets orphaned, lovely Yoon Seo-rin (Lee Bo-young), he thinks that she's the girl of his dreams, but is unsure whether to trust her.

Cast
 Shin Ha-kyun as Oh Bok-gyu
 Lee Bo-young as Yoon Seo-rin
 Baek Yoon-sik as Park Tae-chon
 Kim Chang-wan as Kim Sang-chul
 Jo Mi-ryung as Madam Hong
 Go Soo-hee as Kim Choo-ja
 Moon Hee-kyung as Noh Mae-ja
 Kang Byul as Park Song-yi
 Jung Kyung-ho as Sang-geun
 Park Hyo-jun as Ha-geun
 Choi Joo-bong Kim Pil-choong
 Park Hye-jin as Lee Soon-yi
 Kwon Byung-gil as Choi Sung-shik
 Jeon Se-hong as Yoo-ra
 Jung Tae-won as Hang-joon
 Lee Joo-shil
 Lee Hee-jung
 Yoon Byung-hee
 Kim Dong-hyeon

Awards
Director Jo Hyun-tak won the New Media Award at the 3rd Korea Drama Awards in 2010.

References

External links
 

2010 South Korean television series debuts
2010 South Korean television series endings
TVN (South Korean TV channel) television dramas
South Korean suspense television series
South Korean comedy television series
Television shows written by Kim Eun-hee
Television series by JS Pictures